Origine is the fourth studio album released by B1A4 under WM Entertainment. The album was released on October 19, 2020, by WM Entertainment and distributed by Sony Music Entertainment Korea, the album contains 12 tracks including their lead single "Like A Movie".

It marks B1A4's first full studio album since Good Timing in 2016, and their subsequent EP Rollin' and the first release as a trio, following the departures of Jinyoung and Baro.

Background
On September 17, 2020, WM Entertainment announced that B1A4 was preparing to release an album in October. On September 30, the release date was confirmed to be on October 19.

On October 6, a comeback trailer was released to YouTube. On October 7, a full tracklist was released, containing a total of 12 tracks.

Track listing

References 

B1A4 albums
2020 albums
Sony Music albums